Brunei national under-21 football team is the under-21 football team of Brunei. The team participates in the Hassanal Bolkiah Trophy and the AFC U-20 Asian Cup.

International records

AFC Youth Championship
 1970 AFC Youth Championship
 1972 AFC Youth Championship
 1974 AFC Youth Championship
 1975 AFC Youth Championship

AFC U-20 Asian Cup

Fixtures and results

2022

Coaching staff

Current squad 
23-man squad for the 2023 AFC U-20 Asian Cup qualification matches to be held in Bishkek, Kyrgyzstan in September 2022.

See also 
 Brunei national football team
 Brunei national under-23 football team
 Brunei national under-19 football team
 Brunei national under-17 football team

References 

 u21
1970 establishments in Brunei
Association football clubs established in 1970